WAZK (97.7 FM) is an adult album alternative formatted station licensed to Nantucket, Massachusetts. The station is owned by Nantucket Radio, LLC.  WAZK first signed on at 5 p.m. on May 24, 2012. The first song played on the station was "Hurricane" by Bob Dylan.

External links
 

AZK
Nantucket, Massachusetts
Adult album alternative radio stations in the United States
Radio stations established in 2012